Ingaderia is a genus of lichen-forming fungi in the family Opegraphaceae. The genus was circumscribed by British botanist Otto Vernon Darbishire in 1897.

The synonym name of Darbishirella is in honour of Otto Vernon Darbishire (1870–1934), who was a British botanist who specialised in marine algae and lichens.

References

Arthoniomycetes
Arthoniomycetes genera
Lichen genera
Taxa described in 1897
Taxa named by Otto Vernon Darbishire